Xàtiva is a town in eastern Spain, in the province of Valencia, on the right (western) bank of the river Albaida and at the junction of the Valencia–Murcia and Valencia Albacete railways. It is located 25 km west of the Mediterranean Sea. During the Al-Andalus Islamic era, Arabs brought the technology to manufacture paper to Xàtiva. In the 12th century, Xàtiva was known for its schools, education, and learning circles. Islamic scholar Abu Ishaq al-Shatibi's last name refers to Xàtiva where he lived and died.
After the Reconquista by Northern Christian kingdoms and the following Christian repopulation, the city became the cradle of one of the most powerful and controversial families of the Renaissance, the House of Borgia, which produced Popes like Callixtus III (Alfonso de Borgia) and Alexander VI (Rodrigo de Borgia).

History

Xàtiva (Saetabis in Latin) was famous in Roman times for its linen fabrics, mentioned by the Latin poets Ovid and Catullus. Xàtiva is also known as an early European centre of paper manufacture. In the 12th century, Arabs brought the technology to manufacture paper to Xàtiva ( Shāṭiba).

It is the birthplace of two popes, Callixtus III and Alexander VI, and also the painter José Ribera (Lo Spagnoletto). It suffered a dark moment in its history at the hands of Philip V of Spain, who, after his victory at the Battle of Almansa during the War of the Spanish Succession, had the city besieged then ordered it to be burned and renamed San Felipe. In memory of the insult, the portrait of the monarch hangs upside down in the local museum of l'Almodí.

Xàtiva was briefly a provincial capital under the short-lived 1822 territorial division of Spain, during the Trienio Liberal. The Province of Xàtiva was revoked with the return to absolutism in 1823.

Main sights
Xàtiva is built on the margin of a fertile plain, and on the northern slopes of the Monte Vernissa, a hill with two peaks crowned by Xativa Castle.

The Collegiate Basilica, dating from 1414, but rebuilt about a century later in the Renaissance style, was formerly a cathedral, and is the chief among many churches and convents. The town-hall and a church on the castle hill are partly constructed of inscribed Roman masonry, and several houses date from the Moorish period.

Other sights include:
Royal Monastery of the Assumption, Gothic and Baroque style, built during the 14th century and renovated in the 16th–18th centuries.
Natal house of the Pope Alexander VI.
Sant Feliu (St Felix) – 13th century church.
Sant Pere (St Peter) - 14th century church. The interior has a Coffered ceiling decorated in Gothic-Mudéjar style.
Hermitage of Santa Anna (15th century), in Gothic style
Almodí, a 14th-century Gothic edifice (1530–1548) now housing a Museum
Casa de l'Ensenyança, Xàtiva
Sant Francesc
Village of Anahuir

Notable people
Abu al-Qasim al-Shatibi (538–590 AH / 1144–1194 CE)
Abu Ishaq al-Shatibi (720–790 AH / 1320–1388 CE) 
Pope Calixtus III (1378–1458)
Pope Alexander VI (1431–1503)
Tomás Cerdán de Tallada (1530–1614)
Diego Ramírez de Arellano (1580–1624)
Jusepe de Ribera (1591–1652)
Jaime Villanueva (1765–1824)
Raimon (1940–)
Joan Ramos (1942–)
Toni Cucarella (1959-)
Feliu Ventura (1976–)

Gallery

See also 
 Route of the Borgias

References

External links 

 
Route of the Borgias